Aliabad (also Romanized as ‘Alīābād) is a village in Ahmadabad-e Mostowfi Rural District, in the Central District of Eslamshahr County, Tehran Province, Iran. At the 2006 census, its population was 27, in 6 families.

References 

Populated places in Eslamshahr County